G.R. Mane was born in 1892 in Kolhapur, North-Western Provinces, British India. He was an actor, best known for his role in Gopal Krishna. He died in 1954 in India.

References

1892 births
1954 deaths
Male actors in British India